Vanaspara  (ruled circa 130 CE) was an Indo-Scythian Northern Satrap (kshtrapa). He is mentioned as a "Satrap" (Brahmi:, Kṣatrapa, "Satrap") of Kushan ruler Kanishka I on an inscription discovered in Sarnath, and dated to the 3rd year of Kanishka (c. 130 CE), in which Kanishka mentions he was, together with "Great Satrap" Kharapallana, governor of the eastern parts of his Empire.

The inscription was discovered on an early statue of a Boddhisattva, the Sarnath Bala Boddhisattva, now in the Sarnath Museum .

References

External links
Dates of Kanishka and the Indo-Scythians

Indo-Scythian kings
2nd-century monarchs in Asia
2nd-century Iranian people